Cristóbal Ortega Martínez (born 25 July 1956) is a Mexican former professional footballer who played for América in the Mexican Primera División from 1974 to 1992. He played as a midfielder. He also played for Mexico's national team, including playing in the World Cups of 1978 and 1986 - he earned 24 caps in his international career.

Club career 

On 5 October 1974, Cristóbal Ortega made his debut for Club América against Ciudad Madero. In his Primera Liga debut on 8 June 1975, Ortega scored his first goal against Veracruz - so began an 18-year career in which he remained in the Club América midfield. Club América won league titles in the seasons 75–76, 83–84, 84–85, Prode 85, 87-88 and 88–89. The club won three Supercups, in 1976, 1988–89; three CONCACAF Cup titles in 1978, 1987, and 1991; and the Interamerican Cup in 1991.

Ortega retired in the middle of the 1991–92 season. In his final game for Club América, on 15 December 1991 at Santos Laguna, he started and was substituted at the start of the second half by manager Isaac Terrazas; he scored his last goal three years prior on January 3, 1988, against Cruz Azul. In his career at Club América, Ortega played in 711 games, including a team-record 75 playoff games.

International career 
Ortega played in 24 games for Mexico and scored four goals. He played in the World Cups of 1978 and 1986.

Honours
América
Méxican Primera División: 1975–76, 1983–84, 1984–85, Prode-1985, 1987–88, 1988–89
Campeón de Campeones: 1976, 1988, 1989
CONCACAF Champions' Cup: 1977, 1987, 1990
Copa Interamericana: 1977, 1991

Mexico
CONCACAF Championship: 1977

Individual
Mexican Primera División Golden Ball: 1982–83

References

Cristobal Ortega trabaja para que sus Albinegros sean contundentes (Spanish; article dated January 22, 2009)

External links

Living people
Club América footballers
1956 births
Footballers from Mexico City
1978 FIFA World Cup players
1986 FIFA World Cup players
Mexico international footballers
Association football midfielders
Mexican footballers
Liga MX players
CONCACAF Championship-winning players